Kelly Hill Conservation Park, formerly the Kelly Hill National Park, is a protected area in South Australia located on Kangaroo Island. The Kelly Hill Caves system is the main attraction within the conservation park. In 1993, a portion of the conservation park was excised to create the Cape Bouguer Wilderness Protection Area. It is classified as an IUCN Category III protected area.

See also
 Karatta, South Australia
 Protected areas of South Australia

References

External links
Kelly Hill Conservation Park webpage on protected planet

Protected areas of Kangaroo Island
Conservation parks of South Australia
Protected areas established in 1971
1971 establishments in Australia